Dominican holidays may refer to: 

Public holidays in Dominica
Public holidays in the Dominican Republic